The Musée départemental d'Art ancien et contemporain  is a museum in Épinal, Vosges, France.

Collection

The museum has a collection of paintings that includes works by Rembrandt (Mater Dolorosa), Georges de La Tour, Le Lorrain, Simon Vouet, Pierre Mignard, Jan Brueghel the Elder, Jacob van Ruysdael, Jan van Goyen, Salvator Rosa, Sebastiano Ricci, Nicolas de Largillière, Giovanni Paolo Pannini and Hubert Robert.

External links
 
 Musée départemental d'art ancien et contemporain at Vosges.fr

Museums in Vosges (department)
Épinal
Art museums and galleries in France